NuVasive, Inc. is a medical devices company based in San Diego, California. The company primarily develops medical devices and procedures for minimally invasive spine surgery. NuVasive's products include software systems for surgical planning and monitoring, access instruments, and implantable hardware. Conditions that NuVasive products help treat are: degenerative disc disease, lumbar spinal stenosis, degenerative spondylolisthesis, cervical disc degeneration, early onset scoliosis, and limb length discrepancy.

In the United States and internationally, most of NuVasive's products are marketed directly to doctors, hospitals, and other healthcare facilities. They focus on integrated systems for their surgeon partners.

Business segments 
NuVasive has three business segments: Spine, Orthopedics (NuVasive Specialized Orthopedics), and Neuromonitoring (NuVasive Clinical Services).

History 

NuVasive incorporated on July 21, 1997, as a medical device company in San Diego, California. The NuVasive approach to Minimally Invasive Surgery (MIS) was a new surgical platform called Maximum Access Surgery (MAS). The flagship procedure is the XLIF (eXtreme Lateral Interbody Fusion) procedure, a minimally disruptive procedure that allows spine surgeons to have direct access to the intervertebral space from the side of the body, as opposed to the front or back. Their patient support division is called The Better Way Back. NuVasive acquired the LessRay product from SafeRay Spine and launched the product in 2018 as a fluoroscopy system that enhances the clarity of radiographic images. They provide medical equipment, surgical support, and necessary funds to those in need of spine surgery around the world through the NuVasive  Spine Foundation.

Corporate governance 
As of 2021, members of the board of directors of NuVasive are:

 Chris Barry
 Vickie Capps
 John DeFord
 Robert Friel
 Scott Huennekens
 Siddhartha Kadia
 Leslie Norwalk
Amy Belt Raimundo
 Donald Rosenberg
 Daniel Wolterman

Recent acquisitions 
In 2016, Biotronic NeuroNetwork and Ellipse Technologies were acquired by NuVasive. In 2017, Vertera Spine and SafePassage were acquired by NuVasive. In 2021, NuVasive acquired Simplify Medical

References

External links 

Companies listed on the Nasdaq
2004 initial public offerings
Companies based in San Diego
American companies established in 1997
1997 establishments in California
1997 establishments in the United States
Companies established in 1997